is a Japanese biochemist.

Mizuuchi completed his undergraduate and graduate studies at Osaka University. He received the NAS Award in Molecular Biology 1989, and he was named a foreign associate of the United States National Academy of Sciences in 1994, while working for the National Institutes of Health's National Institute of Diabetes and Digestive and Kidney Diseases (NIDDKD).

In 2016, Mizuuchi and his postdoctoral fellow Anthony Vecchiarelli won the Federation of American Societies for Experimental Biology (FASEB)'s BioArt competition by videotaping the oscillations of fluorescently-labeled Min system proteins involved in bacterial septum localization.

References

Living people
Osaka University alumni
Japanese expatriates in the United States
Japanese biochemists
Foreign associates of the National Academy of Sciences
Year of birth missing (living people)